The Pūerua River, prior to 2018 spelled Puerua River, is a river in South Otago, New Zealand. A tributary of the Clutha River / Mata-Au, it rises east of Brown Dome and flows eastward to join that river near Port Molyneux.

See also
List of rivers of New Zealand

References

Rivers of Otago
Rivers of New Zealand